
The Old Jail in Saint Ann's Bay is said to have been the very first prison in Jamaica. Built as a fort , it was declared useless in 1795 as the sea was encroaching. It was then converted into a jail and house of correction. The jail had solitary cells, a treadmill, a separate room for lunatics, a room for debtors, a 'hospital', and a jailers' quarters. Many slaves died there.

See also

List of prisons in Jamaica

References

External links
Aerial view.

Prisons in Jamaica
Buildings and structures in Saint Ann Parish
Debtors' prisons